Two special elections in Nebraska were held on November 2, 1954, alongside a regular election. The Class I election was to finish Hugh A. Butler's term, with Samuel W. Reynolds appointed to the vacancy on July 3, 1954. The Class II election was to finish Kenneth S. Wherry's term, with Eva Bowring as incumbent at the time of the election. Both seats were held by Republicans, with Roman Hruska winning the Class I election and Hazel Abel winning the Class II election.

Class I 

In the 1952 election, incumbent Senator Hugh A. Butler was re-elected to a third term. Following his death on July 1, 1954, Samuel W. Reynolds was appointed to the vacant seat. Roman Hruska won the special election to complete Butler's term, defeating James F. Green.

Democratic primary

Candidates 
James F. Green, president of the Omaha-Douglas County Health Board

Results

Republican primary

Candidates 
Roman Hruska, Representative for Nebraska's 2nd district

Results

Results

Class II 

In the 1948 election, Kenneth S. Wherry was re-elected to a second term. Following his death on November 29, 1951, Fred A. Seaton was appointed to the seat until the special election the following year, when Dwight Griswold was elected to finish Wherry's term. He died on April 12, 1954, and Eva Bowring was appointed to the vacancy, the first woman to represent Nebraska in the Senate. Hazel Abel (on the ballot as Mrs. George P. Abel), became the first woman elected to the Senate from Nebraska on November 2, 1954. She resigned on December 31, 1954, to give the incoming Senator Carl Curtis a seniority advantage. Curtis was appointed the following day.

Democratic primary

Candidates 
Mabel Gillespie, former State Senator for the 7th district
William H. Meier, Democratic candidate for Nebraska's 1st district in 1946

Results

Republican primary

Candidates 
Hazel Abel, vice president of the State Republican Central Committee
Hugh Carson, State Senator for the 29th district

Results

Results

References 

Nebraska 1954
Nebraska 1954
1954 Special
Nebraska Special
United States Senate Special
United States Senate 1954